This article is meant to give a list of Book of Mormon rulers, including kings and chief judges among the Lamanites, Nephites, and Jaredites.

Nephites 
The Nephites had kings to begin with, then judges, then a brief period of anarchy, then self-governance, initially led by the Savior's teachings.

Reign of the Nephite Kings in the Land of Zarahemla 
 Nephi (569 BC)
 2nd Nephi, 3rd Nephi, etc. (Names not given) (c. 540 - 279 BC)
 Mosiah (c. 200 BC)
 Benjamin (c. 154 BC)
 Mosiah II (c. 124 BC)

Nephite Kings in the Land of Lehi-Nephi  (which became Lamanite Territory)
 Zeniff (c. 190 BC)
 Noah (c. 160 BC)
 Limhi (about 130 BC)

Reign of the Nephite Judges in the Land of Zarahemla 
 Alma2 (c. 91 BC)
 Nephihah (c. 83 BC)
 Pahoran1 (c. 68 BC)
 Pahoran2 (c. 52 BC)
 Pacumeni (c. 51 BC)
 Helaman3 (c. 50 BC)
 Nephi2 (c. 39 BC)
 Cezoram (c. 30 BC)
 son of Cezoram (no name given) (c. 26 BC)
 Seezoram (c. 23 BC)
 various judges with no names given (c. 20-? BC)
 Lachoneus1 (c. AD 1)
 Gidgiddoni (c. AD 16-18) 
 Lachoneus2 (c. AD 30)

Lamanites 
The Lamanites appear to have had mostly kings:

Lamanite Kings in the Land of Lehi-Nephi
 Laman (about 588-559 BC)
 Laman2, contemporary of King Zeniff
 Laman, son of Laman (?)
 Amalickiah
 Ammoron
 Tubaloth
 Aaron

Jaredites

Kings 

 Orihah
 Moron

See also
 Jaredite kings

References 

 Rulers
Rulers